Rwanda competed in the Commonwealth Games for the first time at the 2010 Games in Delhi, India.

Medal tally

Rwanda is unranked on the all-time medal tally of the Commonwealth Games, having never won a medal.

History
Rwanda joined the Commonwealth of Nations in November 2009 and gained membership to the Commonwealth Games Federation shortly afterwards.

References

 
Nations at the Commonwealth Games